AN/SPS-2 is a three-dimensional radar manufactured by General Electric. It was used by the US Navy as a height finder radar after World War II, and was only used equipped aboard two naval vessels during the Cold War.

AN/SPS-2 
It was only equipped aboard two ships which was USS Northampton and USS Little Rock as the radar alone weights 23.6 tons and while the whole system weights 44 tons. It was too heavy to be fitted aboard any destroyers, thus only used twice aboard cruisers.

Its first service started aboard USS Northampton, commissioned in 1953. The second radar was put in service aboard USS Little Rock in 1960, after she had completed her guided-missile cruiser conversion.

On board ships 
USS Northampton
USS Little Rock

Gallery

See More 

 List of radars
 Radar configurations and types
 Height finder radar

Citations

References 

 Norman Friedman (2006). The Naval Institute Guide to World Naval Weapon Systems.  Naval Institute Press.  ISBN 9781557502629
 Self-Defense Force Equipment Yearbook 2006-2007. Asaun News Agency. ISBN 4-7509-1027-9

Naval radars
Military radars of the United States
Military equipment introduced in the 1950s